Zhuravlikha is a rural locality (a selo) and the administrative center of Zhuravlikhinsky Selsoviet, Pervomaysky District, Altai Krai, Russia. The population was 880 as of 2013. There are 6 streets.

Geography 
Zhuravlikha is located 62 km southeast of Novoaltaysk (the district's administrative centre) by road. Talovka is the nearest rural locality.

References 

Rural localities in Pervomaysky District, Altai Krai